is a Hong Kong professional footballer of partial Japanese descent who currently plays for Hong Kong Premier League club Resources Capital. He plays as a forward.

Club career

Kitchee
Born in Hong Kong to a Japanese father and Hong Kong mother, Harima spent time with Eastern and Rangers before joining Kitchee in 2013. He signed his first professional contract in July 2015, and was named among the substitutes the next month in a 2015 AFC Cup game against Kuwait SC, but did not appear in his side's 6-0 defeat.

He would have to wait until March 2016 to make his senior debut, which came in a group stage 2016 AFC Cup game against Balestier Khalsa. He came on as a 64th minute substitute for Sham Kwok Keung in the 0–1 defeat.

Harima scored his first professional goal in April 2016, the only goal in a 1–0 win over Filipino side Kaya, having replaced Lo Kwan Yee only 3 minutes earlier.

He made his league debut for Kitchee in a 2–0 win over Eastern, again replacing Sham Kwok Keung, in the 62nd minute.

Dreams
On 8 July 2017, Harima was loaned to Dreams for the 2017-18 season along with Cheng Chin Lung and Law Tsz Chun.

Hoi King
On 24 July 2018, following a preseason friendly, Hoi King confirmed that they had acquired Harima on loan. On 16 January 2019, Harima's loan was terminated and the player returned to Kitchee.

Eastern
On 30 June 2019, it was reported that Harima would return to Eastern.

Rangers
On 31 October 2020, it was reported that Harima would join Rangers.

Harima departed the club on 10 July 2021.

Resources Capital
On 30 August 2021, Harima joined Resources Capital.

Career statistics

Club

Notes

Honours

Club
Eastern
 Hong Kong Senior Shield: 2019–20
 Hong Kong FA Cup: 2019–20

Kitchee
 Hong Kong Senior Shield: 2018–19
 Hong Kong FA Cup: 2018–19

References

External links
 
 

Living people
1998 births
Hong Kong footballers
Association football forwards
Hong Kong Premier League players
Kitchee SC players
Dreams Sports Club players
Hoi King SA players
Eastern Sports Club footballers
Hong Kong Rangers FC players
Resources Capital FC players
Hong Kong people of Japanese descent